Trilepis is a genus of flowering plants belonging to the family Cyperaceae.

Its native range is Northern South America to Brazil.

Species:
 Trilepis ciliatifolia T.Koyama 
 Trilepis kanukuensis Gilly

References

Cyperaceae
Cyperaceae genera